Dynamena may refer to:
 Dynamena (hydrozoan), a genus of hydrozoans in the family Sertulariidae
 Dynamena, a genus of butterflies in the family Nymphalidae, synonym of Dynamine
 Dynamena, a genus of crustaceans in the family Sphaeromatidae, synonym of Dynamene